Bouverie is an English surname, and may refer to:

 Bartholomew Bouverie (1753–1835), British MP
 Charles Henry Bouverie (1782–1836), British MP
 Edward des Bouverie (c. 1690 – 1736), British MP and baronet
 Edward Bouverie (senior) (1738–1810), British MP
 Edward Bouverie (junior) (1760–1824), British MP
 Edward Bouverie Pusey (1800–1882), English churchman
 Jacob des Bouverie, 1st Viscount Folkestone (1694–1761)
 William des Bouverie (1656–1717), English merchant and baronet
 William Bouverie, 1st Earl of Radnor (1725–1776)
 William Henry Bouverie (1752–1806), British MP